Perur Pateeswarar Temple is a Hindu temple dedicated to Lord Shiva located at Perur, in western part of Coimbatore in state of Tamil Nadu in India. The temple was built by Karikala chola in 2nd century CE. The temple is located on the bank of the Noyyal River and has been patronized by poets like Arunagirinathar and Kachiappa Munivar. Lord Shiva, known as ‘Patteeswarar’, is the presiding deity of this temple together with his consort Parvati, who is known as ‘Pachainayaki’. The deity is believed to be ‘Swayambu Lingam’ (self-emerged).

Various names for this temple have been used over the years, including, Kamadenupuri, pattipuri, Adhipuri, Daksha Kailasham, Thavasiddhapuram, Gnanapuram, Kalyanapuram, Pirava Neri Thalam, Pasupathipuram, and Melai Chidambaram.

History
The temple was built by king Karikala Chola in 2nd century CE, thus making this one of the oldest temple in the state and even India. During the rule of Raja Raja Chola I, 'Artha Mahal' and 'Maha Mahal' were constructed.Additional offerings from the Chola king were made on a regular basis and were noted on the walls of the temple.

History reveals that the great poet Sundarar sung the devotional 'Devaram' song in this temple by the 7th century CE. But oddly, while having seven of the 276 temples, Perur Pateeswarar Temple does not appear on the list of Kongu Nadu Padal petra sthalams.

From the 14th to 17th centuries, the kings from different dynasties like Hosala dynasty, Vijanagara Empire, Nayakkar Kings have contributed immense donations for the maintenance of this temple. The famous 'Kanaga Sabhai' was built around the 17th century, by Azhagathiri Nayakkar of Madurai.

By 18th century CE, the primary deities were renovated and also a Mahal for the 63 Nayanmaars were raised. By the 20th century, the Kalyana Mahal and the front Mahal were constructed, and the tower was renovated as well.

Architecture

This temple has several gopurams and halls, famous of which is, 'Kanaka Sabha', the one with the golden statue of Nataraja. The ceiling is covered in a network of stone chains, and the pillars are decorated with carvings of Shiva in his different forms.

There is a Patti Vinayagar shrine, dedicated to Ganesha. The Arasambalavanar Shrine dedicated to Shiva at the spot where Shiva is believed to have performed his Thandav under a peepul tree. There are also statues of Gajasamhara, Virabhadra, Bikshadana, Oordhva Thandava, Saraswati with Veena. The sacred trees associated with temple are the palm and tamarind trees, called Irava Panai and Pirava Puli.

Culture
Every year the temple celebrates a classical dance week, typically Bharata Natyam. Dance schools from all across the city, including those from foreign cities, perform in front of the audience, each wowing them with their prowess and talent. The temple is believed to be one of the places where Shiva is believed to have performed Ananda Thandavam.

Temple Car Festival
Every year in the month of Panguni, Panguni Uthiram is celebrated. A lavishly constructed temple chariot is paraded through the neighbourhood as part of the celebration.

Seedling Planting Festival
The festival is celebrated by the farming community, Devendrakula Velalar from ancient times in the banks of Noyyal River. The festival is conducted in the month of Aani. The ritual forms a part of Indra festival from ancient times.

Temple Pond
The Pond is situated opposite of the temple and it used for important rituals such as Panguni Uthiratam.

Temple Lake
Perur Padithurai is 200 meters North from temple and it is situated on the Southern bank of Noyyal River.

Darshan timings
The temple is open on all days. The darshan timings are as below 
 Morning : 06:15 to 13:00 IST
 Evening : 16:00 to 20:00 IST

References

External links

 Official Website
 Temple's Speciality Dinamalar

Tourist attractions in Coimbatore
Buildings and structures in Coimbatore
Shiva temples in Coimbatore district
Chola architecture
Dravidian architecture
Hindu temples in Coimbatore district